George Moberly (10 October 1803 – 6 July 1885) was an English cleric who was headmaster of Winchester College, and then served as Bishop of Salisbury from 1869 until his death.

Life
He was born in St Petersburg, Russia in 1803, the seventh son of Edward Moberly, merchant, and his wife, Sarah Cayley, and educated at Winchester College. He matriculated at Balliol College, Oxford in 1822, and graduating B.A. 1825, and M.A. 1828. He was a Fellow of Balliol from 1826 to 1834. He was ordained deacon in 1826, and priest in 1828.

Moberly married Mary Anne Crokat on 22 December 1834 at South Cadbury, Somerset. After his academic career he became headmaster of Winchester in 1835.

This post Moberly resigned in 1866, and retired to the Rectory of St. Mary's Church, Brighstone, Isle of Wight, he was also a Canon of Chester Cathedral. The Prime Minister William Ewart Gladstone, however, in 1869 called him to be Bishop of Salisbury, in which see he kept up the traditions of his predecessors, Bishops Hamilton and Denison, his chief addition being the summoning of a diocesan synod.

Though Moberly left Oxford at the beginning of the Oxford Movement, he fell under its influence: the more so that at Winchester he formed a most intimate friendship with Keble, spending several weeks every year at Otterbourne, the next parish to Hursley.

Moberly, however, retained his independence of thought, and in 1872 he astonished his High Church friends by joining in the movement for the disuse of the damnatory clauses in the Athanasian Creed. His chief contribution to theology is his Bampton Lectures of 1868, on The Administration of the Holy Spirit in the Body of Christ. He died on 6 July 1885.

Family
Moberly married in 1834 Mary Crokat, daughter of Thomas Crokat of Leghorn. There were 15 children of the marriage, eight daughters and seven sons. Five sons and seven daughters survived their father. The children included:

Mary Louisa, the third child, married George Ridding.
Robert Campbell Moberly (1845–1903), was the third son.
Charlotte Anne Moberly (1846–1937), the tenth child, became the first principal of St Hugh's College, Oxford, and was involved in the Moberly-Jourdain incident.
John Cornelius Moberly was the fourth son.
Edward Hugh Moberly (born c.1850), son, was a cleric.  
Walter Allan Moberly, a cleric, was the sixth son.

His great-grandson, Dick Milford, was a clergyman and educator who was involved in the founding of Oxfam.

References

Attribution:

External links

 Bibliographic directory from Project Canterbury
 

1803 births
1885 deaths
People educated at Winchester College
Alumni of Balliol College, Oxford
Bishops of Salisbury
Headmasters of Winchester College
19th-century Anglican theologians